A county is a geographical area used or formerly used in several countries for administration or other purposes. A single list of former counties is not practical so there are several more defined lists arranged by country or smaller area:

Australia
Counties of Tasmania
Canada
List of former counties of Quebec
List of former counties of Manitoba (1875–1890)
Former counties of Ontario
Denmark
Counties of Denmark, which were abolished in 2007
Kingdom of Hungary
List of administrative divisions of the Kingdom of Hungary (–1918)
List of counties of the Kingdom of Hungary located in Slovakia counties in modern-day Slovakia that were part of the Kingdom of Hungary until 1920
New Zealand
List of counties of New Zealand (1876–1989)
United Kingdom **Ceremonial counties of England
Shires of Scotland
Preserved counties of Wales
United States
List of former United States counties

See also
Former administrative divisions of Romania
:Category:Former counties